The Association of School and College Leaders (ASCL), formerly the Secondary Heads Association (SHA), is a UK professional association for leaders of schools and colleges.

History
The Association of Head Mistresses (AHM) was founded in 1874. The Headmasters' Association (HMA) was founded in 1890. The Secondary Heads Association was formed in 1977 by the amalgamation of these two organisations. In 1983, deputy heads were allowed to join with other senior teaching staff following in the early 1990s and business managers in 2005. By 2005, two-thirds of the membership were not heads but other senior staff, and the association also had a membership in the college sector, so the name was changed in January 2006 to the current name.

Membership
The ASCL's membership is formed of headteachers, principals, deputy heads, vice-principals, assistant heads, assistant principals, business managers and other senior post holders in schools and colleges. There are also some members in other education posts of similar seniority. ASCL has accepted members from primary schools since July 2015. It has members in every type of school including community, foundation, trust, academy, voluntary, independent, grammar, comprehensive, and special schools, and also in FE and sixth form colleges both maintained and independent. It has at least one member from virtually all such schools and colleges, in the great majority including the headteacher or principal. Members in Wales and Northern Ireland are represented by ASCL Cymru and ASCL Northern Ireland respectively, and ASCL is affiliated to School Leaders Scotland (SLS).

Structure
The Association of School and College Leaders has as its ruling parliament a group of elected members collectively known as council. It is at council that association policy is determined. It is from council that national officers, including the president, are elected.
The President, Vice-President and Immediate Past President, collectively known as the Presidential trio, lead ASCL in conjunction with the General Secretary.  
Other senior staff include:
 Richard Tanton, Member Support Director.
 Julie McCulloch, Policy Director.
 Steve Kind, Finance and Operations Director.
 Kcarrie Valentine, Head of ASCL Professional Development

There are 40 staff at the association's HQ in Regent Road, Leicester, and a further 48 across the UK.
ASCL has a training section called ASCL Professional Development.

Past Presidents of ASCL 

The current Presidential trio consists of Pepe Di'lasio (President),  Evelyn Forde (Vice-President) and Rachael Warwick (Immediate Past President).

 2020/2021 Richard Sheriff
 2019/2020 Rachael Warwick
 2018/2019 Richard Sheriff
 2017/18 Carl Ward
 2016/17 Sian Carr
 2015/16 Allan Foulds
 2014/15 Peter Kent
 2013/14 Sir Ian Bauckham CBE
 2012/13 Sir Michael Griffiths
 2011/12 Dame Joan McVittie
 2010/11 John Fairhurst
 2009/10 John Morgan
 2008/09 Jane Lees CBE
 2007/08 Brian Lightman
 2006/07 Malcolm Trobe CBE
 2005/06 Sue Kirkham

Affiliations
ASCL has corporate membership agreements with HMC, GSA, SLS and SofH.

External links
 ASCL Official Site
 SLS Official Site
 SoH Official Site
 HMC Official Site
 GSA Official Site
 Catalogue of the AHM archives, held at the Modern Records Centre, University of Warwick
 Catalogue of the HMA archives, held at the Modern Records Centre, University of Warwick

Video clips
 ASCL YouTube channel
 ASCL Vimeo channel

News items
 Improve children's mental health care, head teachers urge
 Teacher shortage and pupil surge creating 'perfect storm' in UK schools
 Advice for schools on helping fasting Muslim pupils through Ramadan
 'Cuts to the post-16 sector are turning it into a Cinderella service - and no one seems to have noticed'

Associations of schools
Education in Leicester
Education trade unions
Education-related professional associations
Organisations based in Leicestershire
Organizations established in 1977
School and College Leaders
Trade unions in the United Kingdom
1977 in education